The Eminent Jay Jay Johnson, Vol. 2 (aka The Eminent Jay Jay Johnson a.k.a. Jay Jay Johnson Quintet, Vol. 2) is the title of a 1954 Blue Note Records recording by American jazz trombonist J. J. Johnson.  It is also the title used by Blue Note for two different-but-related compilation/re-issues from 1955 (12 inch LP) and 1989 (CD).

Reception

The Allmusic review by Stephen Cook stated: "J.J. Johnson's Blue Note sides from the first half of the '50s represent some of the best bop of the day. And for listeners interested in just picking up one of the trombonist's early dates, this second installment of his Eminent J.J. Johnson series is the one to get... a bop classic".  The Penguin Guide to Jazz included both reissue volumes of The Eminent Jay Jay Johnson in its "Core Collection," and assigned its "crown" accolade, along with a four-star rating (of a possible four stars), to both albums.

Release history
This album was originally released as the second of three Jay Jay Johnson albums in Blue Note's 10-inch Modern Jazz 5000 Series (BLP 5057, The Eminent Jay Jay Johnson, Vol. 2).  The previous 10 inch LP release was BLP 5028, Jay Jay Johnson with Clifford Brown and the third 10-inch LP release was BLP 5070, The Eminent Jay Jay Johnson, Vol. 3.  When reissued in 1955 as part of Blue Note's 12-inch 1500 series of LPs, the tracks from the three 10 inch releases were spread across two compilation albums, The Eminent Jay Jay Johnson, Volume 1 (BLP 1505) and The Eminent Jay Jay Johnson, Volume 2 (BLP 1506).  The 12 inch ...Volume 1 compilation included 10 of the original 12 tracks from the first two 10 inch albums while the 12 inch ...Volume 2 release included all 6 tracks from the 10 inch ...Vol. 3 album and one track each from the first two 10 inch albums - together with two 'alternate take' bonus tracks from the 1953 ...with Clifford Brown recording session.  The CD ...Volume 1 and ...Volume 2 releases re-shuffled the previous material again and included additional 'alternate takes' as bonus tracks from the original 1953 and 1955 recording sessions.

Track listing
All compositions by J. J. Johnson except as indicated
1954 (10 inch LP) BLP 5057 - The Eminent Jay Jay Johnson, Vol. 2:
Side 'A'
 "Jay" – 3:42
 "Time After Time" (Sammy Cahn, Jule Styne) – 4:13
 "Old Devil Moon" (E. Y. Harburg, Burton Lane) – 3:52
Side 'B'
 "Too Marvelous for Words" (Johnny Mercer, Richard A. Whiting) – 3:35
 "It's You or No One" (Cahn, Styne) – 4:06
 "Coffee Pot" – 4:08

1955 (12 inch LP) BLP 1506 - The Eminent Jay Jay Johnson, Volume 2: 
Side 'A'
 "'Daylie' Double" – 4:27 
 "Pennies from Heaven" (Johnny Burke, Arthur Johnston) – 4:18
 "You're Mine, You" (Johnny Green, Edward Heyman) – 3:07 
 "Turnpike" [alt. take] – 4:10
 "It Could Happen To You" (Johnny Burke, Jimmy Van Heusen) – 4:42
Side 'B'
 "Groovin'" – 4:40 
 "Portrait of Jennie" (Gordon Burdge, J. Russel Robinson) – 2:56 
 "Viscosity" – 4:21 
 "Time After Time" (Cahn, Styne) – 4:13
 "Capri" [alt. take] – 3:47

2001 (CD) UPC 724353214425 - The Eminent Jay Jay Johnson, Volume 2:  
 "Too Marvelous for Words" (Mercer, Whiting) – 3:35
 "Jay" – 3:42
 "Old Devil Moon" (Harburg, Lane) – 3:52
 "It's You or No One" (Cahn, Styne) – 4:06
 "Time After Time" (Cahn, Styne) – 4:13
 "Coffee Pot" – 4:08
 "Pennies from Heaven (Burke, Johnston) – 4:18 
 "Viscosity" – 4:21 
 "You're Mine, You" (Green, Heyman) – 3:07 
 "Daylie Double" – 4:27 
 "Groovin'" – 4:40 
 "Portrait of Jennie" (Burdge, Robinson) – 2:56 
 "Pennies from Heaven" [alt. take] – 4:25 
 "Viscosity" [alt. take] – 4:21 
 "'Daylie Double'" [alt. take] – 4:38

The 1989/1997 Blue Note CD releases (CDP 7 81506 2, The Eminent Jay Jay Johnson, Volume 2) contain the same tracks as the 2001 CD, arranged chronologically by recording session date.

Personnel
1953 June 22 recording session ("Turnpike", "Capri", "It Could Happen To You")
J.J. Johnson – trombone
Clifford Brown – trumpet (except "It Could Happen To You")
Jimmy Heath – tenor saxophone, baritone saxophone (except "It Could Happen To You")
John Lewis – piano
Percy Heath – bass
Kenny Clarke – drums

1954 September 24 recording session ("Jay", "Time After Time", "Old Devil Moon", "Too Marvelous For Words", "It's You Or No One", "Coffee Pot")
J.J. Johnson – trombone
Wynton Kelly – piano
Charles Mingus – bass
Kenny Clarke – drums
Sabu Martinez – congas (except "It's You or No One" and "Time After Time")

1955 June 6 recording session ("'Daylie' Double", "You're Mine, You", "Pennies From Heaven", "Groovin'", "Viscosity", "Portrait of Jennie")
J.J. Johnson – trombone
Hank Mobley – tenor saxophone
Horace Silver – piano
Paul Chambers – bass
Kenny Clarke – drums

References

Blue Note Records albums
J. J. Johnson albums
1954 albums
Albums recorded at Van Gelder Studio